Middlesex Hospital is a non-profit, acute care community hospital in Middletown, Connecticut.

Its service area includes Middlesex County, Connecticut, and the lower Connecticut River Valley region. In 2015 Middlesex became the first hospital in Connecticut to join the Mayo Clinic Care Network.

Facilities and current operations
Middlesex Hospital provides inpatient medical, surgical and emergency services, as well as outpatient care, including diagnostic, rehabilitation, behavioral health, disease management, radiology, laboratory, cancer care, homecare, wound and ostomy care, surgical services, urgent care, and a network of primary care offices. The hospital employs over 3,100 people and has 381 active medical staff, 77 courtesy medical staff, and 142 allied health professionals.

The hospital has a Family Medicine Residency Program and a Radiologic Technology School. In addition to its emergency department in Middletown, the Health System operates two satellite medical centers in Westbrook, Connecticut, and Marlborough, Connecticut, with fully accredited, stand-alone emergency departments. Combined, the three locations serve the 4th highest emergency patient volume of all Connecticut hospitals. In 2015 the hospital had 13,617 discharges, 663,012 outpatient visits, and 79,563 emergency department visits.

History
In 1895 the Connecticut General Assembly issued a charter incorporating Middlesex Hospital.  With a $20,000 grant from the state, and the gift of the Camp Homestead on Crescent Street, the hospital opened in the spring of 1904.  The hospital's nursing school graduated nurses from 1910 until the Ona M. Wilcox School of Nursing closed in 1997.

Services

Inpatient Care
The hospital is licensed for 297 beds, 33 bassinets and serves a total population of over 250,000 persons.

Walk-In Urgent Care
Middlesex Hospital Urgent Care handles non-emergency medical care in Madison, Connecticut, Middletown and Old Saybrook, Connecticut.

Cancer Center
The Cancer Center offers radiation oncology, medical oncology and supportive services with diagnostic radiology including PET scan, CT scan and MRI close by. The cancer program is an ACoS-approved Comprehensive Community Cancer Center.

Comprehensive Breast Center
Middlesex Hospital is accredited by the American College of Surgeons National Accreditation Program for Breast Centers as a Comprehensive Breast Center. The Breast Center is located at 540 Saybrook Road.

Home Care / Hospice Program
The hospital provides Homecare, hospice and palliative care home visits. The hospice program is Medicare-certified and includes homecare as well as in-patient care within the hospital. It was established in 1985.

Pregnancy and Birth Center
The Pregnancy & Birth Center at Middlesex Hospital is designated as “Baby-Friendly” by Baby-Friendly USA. The Baby-Friendly Hospital initiative recognizes hospitals that provide an optimal level of care and information for breastfeeding moms.

Centers of Excellence
The hospital has Joint Commission approved Centers of Excellence in stroke, joint replacement for hips and knees, and bariatrics. The Middlesex Hospital Center for Joint Replacement has earned The Joint Commission Gold Seal of Approval® for hip and knee replacements.

Awards and recognition

Magnet Hospital

On June 1, 2001, Middlesex Hospital became Connecticut's first Magnet hospital by the American Nurses Credentialing Center (ANCC), an arm of the American Nurses Association.  The hospital has retained its designation since 2001.

Top 100 Hospitals
Middlesex Hospital has been designated four times as one of the Thomson Reuters 100 Top Hospitals®

Best Health Care Rankings
Middlesex Hospital achieved the highest rating possible from U.S. News & World Reports hospital rankings in chronic obstructive pulmonary disease (COPD), heart failure, colon cancer surgery, and hip replacement.

Joint Commission Top Performers
The Hospital was recognized as part of The Joint Commission’s 2015 annual report “America’s Hospitals: Improving Quality and Safety,” for attaining and sustaining excellence in accountability for key quality measures for:
 heart attack
 heart failure
 Pneumonia
 surgical care
 venous thromboembolism
 perinatal care

Healthgrades Quality Awards

Middlesex Hospital  was recognized by Healthgrades for the following five clinical and hospital quality awards:

 America's 100 Best Hospitals for Pulmonary Care Award 2015, 2016, 2017
 America's 100 Best Hospitals for Stroke Care Award 2016, 2017
 Critical Care Excellence Award 2017
 Distinguished Hospital Award for Clinical Excellence 2016
 Outstanding Patient Experience Award 2014, 2016

Middlesex was the only hospital in Connecticut to receive the Patient Experience Award in 2014, and one of only two in 2016.

Middlesex Hospital received an award for Clinical Excellence in 2017  for rating in the top 5% of hospitals in the nation with the lowest risk-adjusted mortality and complication rates across at least 21 of 32 common conditions and procedures.

References

Hospitals in Connecticut